David Penna (born 25 July 1972) is an Australian rugby league coach and former footballer who played for the Parramatta Eels and the South Sydney Rabbitohs during his long professional career.

Penna is the current assistant coach of the Canterbury-Bankstown Bulldogs.

Playing career
Penna made his debut for Parramatta in 1990. He played 22 games over four seasons, often at centre or five-eighth.

In 1994 he moved to join the South Sydney Rabbitohs and played 56 games for the club over four seasons, usually at centre or fullback.  Penna played for Souths in their upset 1994 Tooheys Challenge Cup final victory over Brisbane.

In 1998, Penna returned to Parramatta where he was usually used at five-eighth before moving into the halfback position in 1999. In 2000, Penna was forced to retire after breaking his neck twice and suffering six concussions in the single season.

Coaching career
Penna turned his attention to coaching. In 2009 he coached an Italian XIII. Penna has also coached the Manly-Warringah Sea Eagles Toyota Cup (Under-20s) team. Penna was appointed as Manly's assistant NRL coach for the 2012 season, after Geoff Toovey was promoted to the position of head coach.

On 30 November 2016, he became the assistant coach to Des Hasler at the Canterbury-Bankstown Bulldogs.

In November 2018, he was announced as the new head coach of Canterbury's Jersey Flegg Cup side.

References

External links
David Penna rugbyleague.co.nz

1972 births
Living people
Australian people of Italian descent
Australian rugby league coaches
Australian rugby league players
Parramatta Eels players
Italy national rugby league team coaches
Place of birth missing (living people)
Rugby league five-eighths
South Sydney Rabbitohs players
South Sydney Rabbitohs captains